The Kölner Haie (English: Cologne Sharks) are an ice hockey club based in Cologne, Germany that plays in the professional Deutsche Eishockey Liga (DEL). The team was one of the founding members of the DEL.

The Kölner Haie play their home games in the DEL and the German Cup (DEB-Pokal) at the Lanxess Arena, which opened in 1998, located in the district Deutz. With room for 18,500 spectators, Lanxess Arena is amongst the biggest multi-functional arenas in Europe, and the Kölner Haie have the second highest average attendance in European ice hockey behind Swiss team SC Bern. Previously, the Kölner Haie played their home games at the Eisstadion an der Lentstraße. A strong local rivalry exists between the Kölner Haie and the Düsseldorfer EG, of neighboring Düsseldorf. Games between the two teams often sell out.

History

1972 to 1976: Foundation and relegation
In summer, 1972 the hockey department of the Kölner EK (KEK) which made the puck play in Cologne in different lower classes able of drawing room since 1936 separated from the family association. The members believed to be able to play as an independent association successful hockey, because so more freedom of choice and better financial possibilities existed. 10 August 1972 the independence of the hockey department was decided and Peter Rentergent was appointed the president of the new Kölner EC (KEC). Because the KEC remained first still to the old club as an independent department connected – one was called first Kölner EC in the Kölner EK – the team might begin directly in the second division. The KEK was furthermore a member in the German Ice Hockey Federation and, hence, owned a start authorisation for this play class. The new association should be called originally only Kölner EC – what did not admit, however, the association register because of the resemblance to the Kölner EK. Hence, the addition "The sharks" was added later to the association name. Also in the first logo which the goalkeeper at that time and artist Dieter Horký sketched the shark was illustrated. Today the shark is the unmistakable brand name of the club and since 1995 also officially part of the name.

Immediately in the first season 1972/73 in the second division succeeded the sharks consider the rise in the Eishockey-Bundesliga. With strong players like Detlef Langemann, Wim Hospelt or player and manager Günter Peter occupied team degraded the opponents in the second-highest play class partly in two digits. In her first Bundesliga year there were always problems in and around the team. Thus team captain Sigbert Stotz finished his career on account of an injury and it gave riots in the board of directors. Manager Peter after whom financial problems with his tyre trade were repeated fled without news from the town. The association dismissed the trainer and fetched back rise trainer Ondrej Bendík to the gang. Still one created at the end extremely scarcely the class preservation. Also in the next playing time one had nothing to do with the descent. In 1975/76 became the first big crisis season of the sharks. The quarrel within the presidium led to beginning of the year in 1976 to the resignation of the president Rentergent who had also come under fire because of supposed payments to the players officially still applying as amateurs of the KEC. Besides, on account of the weak abscission and the turbulence in the association – middle of the season was dismissed trainer Bendík because of persistent failure – the numbers of spectators strongly decreased what led to a financial deficit.

1976 to 1983: The first success
In spite of the acute monetary problems the sharks with big transfer drew the attention to themselves., Among the rest, thus new president Jochem Erlemann obliged Gerhard Kiessling and his son Udo as a trainer or defender. Nevertheless, the purchase of Erich Kühnhackl of EV Landshut for the record transfer fee at that time of more than 600,000 DM was even more spectacularly. Strangely in the obligation: Jochem Erlemann had sent several times employee with money to negotiations with Kühnhackl to Landshut which achieved, nevertheless, no success. The star player still changed to Cologne. However, even as had set up of the KEC sportily in the top flight of the league, tax additional payments and debts became known at the rate of more than two million DM. Only by immediately initiated consolidation measures the association president succeeded in turning away the bankruptcy and in holding the play company straight. And thus the sharks in March 1977 managed the profit of the first mastery when one defeated, among the rest, the former standard master from Eisbären Berlin, as well as the Rhenish rivals from Düsseldorfer EG and Krefeld Pinguine in the master round introduced anew.

After the KEC did not manage the sighted title defence, the president obliged many new players., Among the rest, there came Miroslav Sikora who remained the following 20 years as a player and manager linked to the sharks to Cologne. Also Gerhard Kiessling, master trainer of 1977, returned to the sharks, after he had been dismissed immediately after the first championship unexpectedly. The sharks managed in the season the second title profit which was overshadowed, nevertheless, by the resignation of the president. Successor to Jochem Erlemann will appoint Heinz Landen, Clemens Vedder became the treasurer.

The next playing times stood in the sign of the sporty mediocrity as well as the financial consolidation of the association. In the season 1980/81 the Play out of vision qualification reached of the KEC though sportily, however, the team became because of the entanglement in the passport forger's scandal (application of Canadians or American as German players, however, the German nationality had not moved) into the descent round. Moreover, on 9 March 1981 it came in the Bundesliga play against the VfL Bad Nauheim to a mass scrap. The referee covered including match punishments, play duration punishments and disciplinary punishments of a total of 166 penalty minutes.

Till 1983 formed an efficient team with young, ambitious players, as for example Miroslav Sikora, Gerd Truntschka, Uwe Krupp and Helmut de Raaf, as well as experienced players like Udo Kiessling and Uli Hiemer.

1983 to 1988: Four championships in five years
With Jozef Golonka an experienced trainer was obliged who led the team in the finale of the playoff round where one hit on EV Landshut. The sharks defeated Landshuter EV with 5:0 in the fifth and determining play and celebrated the German mastery.

A year later the sharks begun once more as favorites had to be content with place three. On account of an injured person's plight one lined up in the semi-final against the Mannheim ERC only with eleven healthy players. The season, nevertheless, was overshadowed by the foul of the inhabitant of Mannheim Roy Roedger who hit the KEC forward Steve McNeill with the racquet point in the right eye. Only thanks to several operations a part of the visual ability of the eye was saved. Roedger was closed for many plays and was condemned, finally, to a compensation payment at the rate of 200,000 DM. Moreover, the shark forward Peter Schiller provided for sensation, when he in the European cup play against the Bolzano HC which the KEC with 6:1 won, went from boredom with the puck behind own gate and made push-ups.

The season 1985/86, the first playing time in which the former shark player Hardy Nilsson stood as a trainer in the Cologne gang became one of the most successful ones of the association history for the KEC. From beginning the team dominated the league and went as a front runner to the playoffs. There one lost only one play, won in the first final series against the Düsseldorf EC (DEG) with 3:0 victories and celebrated once more the mastery. Before one had already booked in the European cup the second place. However, also this season a tragic secondary phenomenon had for the sharks: 19-year-old Ralph Philipp, nephew of the long-standing KEC forward Rainer Philipp, died with a car accident. Since then the tricot number 8 which had "inherited" the promising young talent from his uncle any more will not award with the sharks to player.

In the season 1986/87 a team since introduction of the playoffs succeeded with the KEC for the first time in defending her title gained in the season before. In the playoffs to which one had gone as a qualifying round second the sharks lost no play and defeated Schwenningen, the DEG and Mannheim in three plays in each case. Already before the season Clemens Vedder had removed his post as a treasurer for private reasons. A year later made the sharks to the Titelhattrick perfect when they won the fifth determining play with 4:1 in the finale of the Playoffs against the sports alliance of Rosenheim. With it they defeated the team which was better placed as only in the qualifying round. At the beginning of the playoffs set of the KEC a record unequalled till this day: Including three victories in each case against Frankfurt and Mannheim the team 20 won playoff plays in succession.

1988 to 1994: The Rhine rivals
After the triple titles, the Sharks were seen as favorites in the 1988/89 season, besides, they had stated the table after the qualifying round. After one had won the vice title in the European cup, nevertheless, the inhabitants of Cologne retired in the semi-final of the national mastery against the DEG. With the DEG one had exchanged before the season the goalkeepers (Joseph "Peppi" Heiss came for Helmut de Raaf), besides, during the season the changes were announced by Dieter Hegen and Gerd Truntschka to the Rhine rival. In the season 1989/90 everything seemed to run out again to the duel between both Rhenish rivals. The sharks booked at the end of the qualifying round place two behind the DEG. Indeed, retired of the KEC in the semi-final against Rosenheim. What remained, was a record existing still today: Nine play out of vision-half final participation in succession.

Also in both following playing times everything ran with the sharks not as planned. In 1990/91 the team had to fight with many injuries, however, the qualification for the playoffs still created as a front runner. There one reached by victories against Hedos München and the BSC Preussen the finale against the DEG. After the KEC had made up for 0:2-match remains, however, one was defeated in the determining fifth play with 0:4. In 1991/92 when the 19-year-old Jozef Stümpel began his international career, riots provided in the sphere from beginning for problems. Thus the surely believed removal of the ice stadium was rejected first by the town. Shortly after seasonal start left to Ray Whitney obliged scarcely the sharks in the direction of North America. When then the seasonal start failed, trainer Nilsson came under fire and after the elimination in the quarterfinal against Mannheim, a struggle for power began behind the scenery which culminated in resignations of several board members.

To the season 1992/93 it came again to financial bottlenecks with the Kölner Haie. In spite of some departures of players the team after the qualifying round reached the second place. In the Playoffs one asserted himself first against Kaufbeuren (3:0) and Mannheim (3:1), before one hit in Final once more on the DEG. In one of the most exciting final series of the Bundesliga history the determining fifth play won the DEG in Brehmstrasse in Düsseldorf with 2:1 after lengthening.

The financial problems of the sharks still worsened when president suffered landing shortly after end of the season a cardiac infarction and fell in the coma. The vice president anew appointed shortly before and manager collected subsequently nearly seven million DM of debts, player's salaries were not partially paid any more. Besides, president landing announced his resignation at the end of the season 1993/94. Bernd Schäfer should redevelop first as an interim president, the association. In spite of the blind relations in the board of directors qualified of the KEC as a fifth certainly for the playoffs where one was defeated in the semi-final by the later master Hedos München.

1994 to 2001: New league, new arena
After the foundation of the Deutsche Eishockey Liga (DEL), in which for the first time associations might also line up as a GmbHs, Heinz Hermann Göttsch assumed the office of the main companion and that of the chairman of the board at the Cologne hockey society founded anew "The sharks" Ltd. By extensive consolidation measures and donation actions of fans the sharks succeeded in getting some high-carat professionals to the Rhine. After a still disappointing qualifying round which the KEC on the sixth-place finished the team increased in the Playoffs of play to play and switched off Kaufbeuren, Mannheim as well as the Berlin Prussians. Finally, in the final series one defeated eV of Landshut in the determining fifth play with 4:0 and celebrated the first mastery of the DEL history.

In the season 1995/96 the association after place One after the qualifying round reached the finale once more where one hit once again on the DEG. However, after of the KEC the first play for itself had decided, no more other victory and it succeeded only the vice mastery remained. Besides, the sharks reached the final in the European cup which got lost against Jokerit Helsinki only in the penalty kick shooting in December 1995. A year later, also the team of the sharks had strongly been changed by the so-called Bosman decision, one was less successful in the European founded anew hockey league (EHL) and already retired in the group phase. In the DEL-Playoffs the team hit in the fourth year as a result of on Landshut. This time, nevertheless, Bavarians won the quarter final series in four plays.

There was a reunion already a year later when one met once more in the quarterfinal. Nevertheless, the sharks, after a streaky qualifying round with a lot of restlessness in the team and in the sphere as a third in the final gone, were to the Landshutern put under and won no play. Also in the next playing time, the sharks had moved in October 1998 in the just finished arena LANXESS (till 2008 "Kölnarena"), there were at the beginning many problems with the KEC. As in the year before players were dismissed shortly after start of the season, the team's structure was not right and the achievements of the team stagnated. Only when with trainer Lahtinen, co-trainer Helland and manager Miro Sikora the complete sporty management had been exchanged, the manager later successful in the NHL Andy Murray provided for more Constance in the association and in the team. In the Playoffs to the mastery the sharks eliminated Lions after five plays, nevertheless, once more in the quarterfinal against Frankfurt.

In the season 1999/2000 the team of the sharks was valid according to many experts as one of the best ones which there was during the last years in the German hockey. Thus everything also ran first as desired: In December one won, as the first German team after 35 years, the top position and in the playoffs booked of the KEC the plumber cup in Davos, after the qualifying round the Augsburg panthers and Berlin Capitals were defeated without defeat. However, in the finale against Munich of baron there came the burglary, the sharks lost next three parts after the prelude victory and had to leave of the baron the title. A year later Scorpions had an influence on Hannover decisively about the seasonal course of the sharks: In January Bob Leslie was removed after a defeat against Scorpions for the second time from Lance Nethery on the trainer's post. On one of the last matchdays qualified of the KEC with a victory against Hannover still for the play-offs, after one threatened to miss them for the first time. In the play-offs retired of the KEC in the quarterfinal then against Scorpions in three plays.

2001 to 2006: Successful years and the Zach era
As during the years the sharks played a weak qualifying round before also in the season 2001/02. Worked out in the year of the 30-year-old association jubilee one fixed only in the end of the qualifying round the move in the final once more. There the sharks hit first on the Krefelder penguins whom one threw, nevertheless, in three plays from the competition. In the semi-final asserted itself of the KEC in five plays against Munich of baron. Also in the finale against the Mannheim eagles only the fifth play decided on the mastery. Norris with 2:1 won of the KEC by gates of Alex Hicks and Dwayne this and gained his eighth German mastery. The term of office of Hans Zach began  with the aim title defence in Cologne. Already during the preceding season the engagement of the coach of the national team at that time was made perfect what entailed that Rich Chernomaz in spite of the championship title no future had in Cologne. The sharks already were convincing in the qualifying round which they finished after a final spurt (20 plays without defeat according to regular playing time) on the second place. This time over Kassel and Mannheim the finale reached of the KEC once more, against the Rhenish rival from Krefeld. After one had lost the first both parts, the team won herself the determining fifth play in the Cologne arena in which, nevertheless, the Krefelder defeated the sharks with 3:1. Besides, beside the vice mastery one stood in the finale of the DEB cup introduced again which one lost, however, against Mannheim.

After the successful last years the sharks were also valid in 2003/04 again to the favorites on the title in the DEL. And after the cup victory in 2004 against Kassel and the fourth place after the qualifying round, one expected a lot from the KEC team. However, from many injuries in the course of the season afflicted sharks could not counterhold in the quarter final series against Frankfurt Lions and failed because of the later German master. Many positive recollections of the season still remained, also because of the new association record of 6,500 sold season tickets as well as the foundation of the Alex' Hicks initiative by the shark forward. A year later – Rodion Pauels had become meanwhile a sports co-ordinator of the sharks – came once more From in the quarterfinal. After another season with many long time injured persons, the sharks booked the fourth place. In the Play-offs the sharks had to come too to themselves against one on account of the Lockouts with NHL players reinforced team of ERC Ingolstadt in the determining seventh play in the Cologne arena 2:5 hit give.

In the season 2005/06 it came after ten years for the first time again to one meeting with the DEG to the play-offs. After the sharks had finished the qualifying round on place 5 and had switched off in the quarterfinal in only four plays Nürnberg Ice Tigers, the half final series followed against the DEG. In the fourth play the sharks dated back shortly before end when Bill Lindsay allowed the lengthening in which he also marked the victory hit. Nevertheless, in the determining play in Brehmerstrasse the sharks were defeated with 3:5 and retired in the semi-final.

2006 to present
In the playing time in 2006/07 the season was also finished in the semi-final for the KEC. In the first year under the new trainer Doug Mason the inhabitants of Cologne played one of heights and depths stamped qualifying round, booked at the end, however, the fifth place and reached thus to 26. Times in succession the play-offs. In the cup finale the sharks, like already in 2003, against the eagles lost Mannheim after lengthening. However, the inhabitants of Cologne won the Play out of vision quarterfinal against the inhabitants of Ingolstadt better placed after the qualifying round, were defeated in the semi-final against later most eagle Mannheim. During the following season there was a spectacular goalkeeper's change with the sharks: Travis Scott – till then statistically the best goalkeeper of the league – received a highly endowed offer of a Russian club and was transferred within less days there. As a substitute the inhabitants of Cologne obliged the German national goalkeeper Robert Müller from Mannheim. This led the KEC till the finale where they were defeated, however, by the polar bears Berlin with 1:3. Before the sharks had defeated acting most Mannheim in the quarterfinal as well as Frankfurt Lions in the semi-final. In the third play of the series against Mannheim both teams set nearly a new world record. Only after 168 minutes Philip Gogulla of the victory hits succeeded in the sixth lengthening.

During the summer break in 2008 there was with the KEC some restlessness, as a forward Ivan Čiernik launched a change in the KHL to HK Sibir Nowosibirsk, because he had been criticised supposedly by trainer Doug Mason. As a substitute with Čiernik the NHL ex-serviceman Mike Johnson whose contract was dissolved, nevertheless, already in December 2008 again was obliged thanks to the contacts by Todd Warriner. After seven successively lost plays to start of the season – to the worst seasonal start of the association history – trainer Doug Mason was dismissed. As a successor for Mason the management determined the former co-trainer Clayton Beddoes to whom with Andreas Lupzig an old friend was provided. In December 2008 separated the sharks also from Beddoes and the present promising trainer Rupert Meister was installed up to the seasonal end as a trainer. Nevertheless, the team in 2008/09 for the first time for 28 years did not reach the playoffs. On account of the weak abscission and the economic crisis stayed behind of the KEC far under his usual spectator's cut what brought the sharks in a heavy financial crisis. For sensation provided of the KEC when he applied for short-time worker's money in spring, 2009 for the employees of the office. Only by the engagement of new companions the insolvency procedure could be prevented.

On 21 May 2009 the Cologne sharks announced that her goalkeeper Robert Müller has died of a cancer illness. As a result, Müller's number, the number 80, with the Cologne sharks was closed. After the Cologne sharks fell in the qualifying round in 2009/10 from the Playoff ranks and lost a large part of her plays, trainers Igor Pawlow and co-trainer Rupert master were released on 2 December 2009 from her duties and were substituted with the trainer's team Bill Stewart and ex-shark player Niklas Sundblad. Nevertheless, still during the season was not clear whether the sharks can play this on account of a renewed deterioration of the financial situation to an end. After one had to make for the time being no application for insolvency, the club reached the first Playoff round, nevertheless, had to be against Ingolstadt ERC hit.

By the abscission bad once more and the finance problems the summer break became in 2010 for the fans the test of patience. Alleingesellschafter Heinz Hermann Göttsch had got out. He had pumped more than 17 years 30 million euros into the association. Nearly everyday announcements in the press about a forthcoming "way to the district court" or failed negotiations with potential new sponsors allowed to cook the rumour kitchen. After the LanxessArena had met the inhabitants of Cologne with a new hire contract, could announce Thomas Eichin on 31 May that one has submitted in time the licence application to the DEL. Nevertheless, of drawing a deep breath was not to be thought yet, because a finance gap of about one million euros stood still in the space which it was a matter to close within the five-day extension put away by the DEL. On 8 June 2010, finally, there came the releasing announcement: „Future of the sharks securely!"  The management had succeeded in winning a group of private investors.

In November 2010 stood of the KEC again at the end of the table and dismissed trainer and manager Stewart. Niklas Sundblad was carried to the coach, new companion Jan Broer became the second manager beside Eichin. Besides, national trainer Uwe Krupp at that time was obliged as a trainer and sports manager to the season 2011/2012. In spite of 15 points in the meantime Remains on the last Play out of vision place the sharks reached the final by a 1:0 victory in Iserlohn on the matchday before last. Nevertheless, after two victories against the promoted team EHC München the team lost all three plays against the Grizzly of Adam Wolfsburg in the quarterfinal. Also the next year survived the sharks who lined up with only five awarded foreign licences, however, the first play out of vision round with two victories against Augsburg, retired once more without victory in the quarterfinal against the later master from Berlin.

On 8 November 2012 an all star play with many former players found to the celebration of the 40-year-old existence of the KEC
instead of. The team of Hardy Nilsson won as a "Kölsche of sharks" 8:4 against the team "Kölsche of volcanoes" from Hans Zach.

The Cologne Sharks on rank two of the table finished the main round of the playing time 2012/2013. After success against Straubing (4:1) and Wolfsburg (3:0) one was defeated in the finale by the Eisbären Berlin with 1:3 plays as a vice master. In the following playing time 2013/2014 the sharks finished the main round on rank five. After victories in quarterfinals and semi-finals they lost the finals 3:4 against ERC Ingolstadt and became once again only vice master.

On Wednesday, 3 October 2018, the Sharks played a friendly exhibition game against the Edmonton Oilers of the National Hockey League which they lost by a score of 4–3 in overtime.

Home arena

History
The ice and swimming stadium Eisstadion an der Lentstraße was Kölner EKs first home in Cologne. The stadium was built in 1936 and home to the Ice Hockey World Championship in 1955. The capacity of 7,200 seats put it in the upper third of DEL arena size.

In 1998 the Kölner Haie moved into the Lanxess Arena. Close to the Lanxess Arena, the Kölner Haie built facilities for a hockey training center and their headquarters.

Home attendance

(In brackets are listed the league and playoff games.)

Honours
DomesticDeutsche Eishockey Liga  Winners: 1977, 1979, 1984, 1986, 1987, 1988, 1995, 2002
  Runners-up: 1991, 1993, 1996, 2000, 2003, 2008, 2013, 2014Deutscher Eishockey-Pokal  Winners: 2004

InternationalEuropean Cup  Runners-up: 1985, 1996
  3rd place: 1989

Pre-seasonSpengler Cup  Winners: 1999Tatra Cup  Winners: 2011

Season statistics

DEL since 1994

Players and personnel
Current roster

Retired numbers
Eight jersey numbers are no longer issued by the Kölner Haie.
 Josef Heiss – #1 He played from 1988 to 2001 for the Kölner Haie.
 Udo Kießling – #4 He was inducted into the International Ice Hockey Federation Hall of Fame in 2000.
 Jörg Mayr – #6 He played exclusively for the Kölner Haie.
 Rainer and Ralph Philipp – #8 Their jersey number is no longer issued following the death of Ralph Philip.
 Miroslav Sikora – #11 His jersey number is no longer issued because of his 16-year association membership.
 Mirko Lüdemann – #12 His jersey number will be no longer issued after his retirement.
 Detlef Langemann – #14 He was captain of the first championteam in 1977.
 Robert Müller – #80 His jersey number taken out of circulation following his death on 21 May 2009.

Notable players

Sergei Berezin
Philip Gogulla
Thomas Greiss
Alex Hicks
Mike Johnson
Udo Kießling
Uwe Krupp
Erich Kühnhackl
Dave McLlwain
Marcel Müller
Robert Müller
Jeremy Roenick
Jozef Stümpel
Ray
Whitney

Head coaches

 Ondrej Bendík, 1972–73
 Jiří Hanzl, 1973–74*
 Ondrej Bendík, 1974–76*
 Kjell-Rune Milton, 1975–76*
 Uli Rudel, 1975–76
 Gerhard Kießling, 1976–77
 Olle Öst, 1977–78
 Gerhard Kießling, 1978–79
 Otto Schneitberger, 1979–80
 Heinz Weisenbach, 1980–83
 Jozef Golonka, 1983–85
 Bob Murdoch, 1995–97
 Kevin Primeau, 1997–98*
 Timo Lahtinen, 1997–99*
 Lance Nethery, 1999–00
 Bob Leslie, 2000–01*
 Lance Nethery, 2000–02*
 Rich Chernomaz, 2001–02
 Hans Zach, 2002–06
 Doug Mason, 2006–08*
 Clayton Beddoes, 2008*
 Rupert Meister, 2008–09
 Igors Pavlovs, 2009*
 Bill Stewart, 2009–10*
 Niklas Sundblad, 2010–11
 Uwe Krupp, 2011–14*
 Niklas Sundblad, 2014–16*
 Cory Clouston, 2016–17*
 Peter Draisaitl, 2017–19*
 Dan Lacroix, 2019*
 Mike Stewart, 2019–20*
 Uwe Krupp, 2020–

*Fired/resigned during the season.

Championship teams

German Champion 1977

German Champion 1979

German Champion 1984

German Champion 1986

German Champion 1987

German Champion 1988

German Champion 1995

German Champion 2002

Team recordsCareer Games Mirko Lüdemann (1002 Games)
 Josef Heiß (690 Games)
 Miroslav Sikora (644 Games)Career Goals Miroslav Sikora (442 Goals)
 Gerd Truntschka (270 Goals)
 Marcus Kuhl (250 Goals)Career Points Miroslav Sikora (838 Points)
 Gerd Truntschka (825 Points)
 Mirko Lüdemann (511 Points)Career Penalty Minutes Dave McLlwain (852 Minutes)
 Andreas Lupzig (811 Minutes)
 Andreas Renz (809 Minutes)Longest Game'
 168:16 minutes (22. March 2008 – 23. March 2008, Semi-final versus Adler Mannheim, scorer of the game-winning-goal was Philip Gogulla, longest Game in German ice hockey history and 2nd longest ice hockey game of all-time)

References

External links

Deutsche Eishockey Liga teams
Sport in Cologne
Ice hockey teams in Germany
Ice hockey clubs established in 1972
1972 establishments in Germany